Tierrantona is a locality and the capital of the municipality of La Fueva, in Huesca province, Aragon, Spain. As of 2020, it has a population of 108.

Geography 
Tierrantona is located 114km east-northeast of Huesca.

References

Populated places in the Province of Huesca